Fresh Pond Parkway is a historic park and parkway on the western end of Cambridge, Massachusetts, part of the Metropolitan Park System of Greater Boston. The parkway was built in 1899 and added to the National Register of Historic Places in 2005.

Fresh Pond Parkway is a four-lane road (two lanes in each direction) stretching from Mount Auburn Street on its southern end to a rotary at Concord Avenue (formerly Cambridge and Concord Turnpike) and Alewife Brook Parkway to the north. Much of the parkway acts as eastern boundary for portions of the city's municipal Fresh Pond reservoir area and connects the reservoir to the Charles River Reservation.

The parkway is part of Massachusetts Route 2 (Route 2) and U.S. Route 3 (US 3) for its entire length. The portion north of Huron Avenue is also part of Route 16.

Route description
Fresh Pond Parkway begins at a large interchange with Mount Auburn Street, a major east-west road in western Cambridge, and Gerry's Landing Road, which serves as the connection between the parkway and Memorial Drive, Greenough Boulevard, and the Eliot Bridge over the Charles River. This section bisects Lowell Memorial Park, with the Elmwood estate the only residence on the east.

North of Brattle Street, the parkway has no median.  In  it reaches Huron Avenue, where Route 16 joins the roadway from the west.  This section is residential on both sides.  The southern portion of the parkway is canopied by mature trees, and has concrete sidewalks on each side, separate by a narrow green strip.

It remains residential on the east side, until Lexington Avenue, when that side becomes commercial. The west side is lined by the Fresh Pond Reservation, with southbound access to a public parking area (limited to city residents) and the facilities of the Cambridge public water supply. The south side of this section continues to be the Fresh Pond Reservation, and the north side is heavily commercialized.

History
A northbound parkway from the Charles River through western Cambridge was proposed by the landscape designer Charles Eliot as early as 1892.  Eliot, a Cambridge resident, had already assisted the city in laying out the Fresh Pond Reservation lands, and believed that a parkway would provide improved access between the Charles River and the Middlesex Fells Reservation.  In 1898 the Metropolitan Parks Commission, the predecessor of the Metropolitan District Commission (MDC) and today's Massachusetts Department of Conservation and Recreation (DCR), began acquiring land for the parkway with the purchase of Lowell Park, formerly a portion of the Elmwood estate.  Land takings continued in 1899, and the section between Gerry's Landing and Huron Avenue was completed in 1900.  The northern section was completed in 1928-1930, following disputes between the MDC and the city over its route and funding.  The connection of Gerry's Landing Road to Eliot Bridge, locally considered part of the parkway, was completed in 1958.

As part of the construction of a new water purification plant on Fresh Pond, the northern section of the parkway was reconstructed. The work included new sidewalks, a bike path on the west side, and roadway realignment. Work was completed in 2002.

Major intersections
The entire route is in Cambridge, Middlesex County.

References

External links

Streets in Cambridge, Massachusetts
Roads on the National Register of Historic Places in Massachusetts
Parkways in Massachusetts
U.S. Route 3
National Register of Historic Places in Cambridge, Massachusetts
Historic districts on the National Register of Historic Places in Massachusetts